This is a list of cities, town and villages in Northern Cyprus. The list first lists the Turkish name followed by the English name.

Lefkoşa District

Lefkoşa Sub-district 

Total: 15

Quarters of Lefkoşa

Quarters of Gönyeli 
 Gönyeli - Kioneli
 Yenikent

Değirmenlik Sub-district 

Total: 13

Quarters of Değirmenlik 
 Bahçelievler
 Başpınar
 Camialtı
 Mehmetçik
 Saray
 Tepebaşı

Gazimağusa District

Gazimağusa Sub-district

Total: 14

Quarters of Gazimağusa

Geçitkale Sub-district

Total: 15

Quarters of Tatlısu 
 Aktunç
 Küçükerenköy
 Yalı

Akdoğan Sub-district

Total: 10

Girne District

Girne Sub-district 

Total: 28

Çamlıbel Sub-district 

Total: 15

Güzelyurt District

Güzelyurt Sub-district 

Total: 12

Quarters of Güzelyurt 
 Asağı Bostancı - Kato Zodeia
 İsmetpaşa
 Lala Mustafa Paşa
 Piyalepaşa
 Yukarı Bostancı - Pano Zodeia

İskele District

İskele Sub-district 

Total: 17

Quarters of İskele 
 Boğaz - Bogaz
 Boğaztepe - Monarga
 Cevizli - Cevizli
 İskele - Trikomo

Mehmetçik Sub-district 

Total: 12

Other 
 Kantara

Yeni Erenköy Sub-district 

Total: 14

Quarters of Dipkarpaz 
 Ersin Paşa
 Polat Paşa
 Sancar Paşa

Lefke District

Lefke Sub-district 

Total: 11

Quarters of Lefke 
 Denizli - Xeros
 Gemikonağı - Karavostasi
 Lefke - Lefka
 Yedidalga - Potamos tou Kampou

See also 
List of uninhabited villages in Northern Cyprus

References 

 
 
Northern Cyprus